Antony Starr (born 25 October 1975) is a New Zealand actor, known for his television roles. He played the dual roles of Jethro and Van West on Outrageous Fortune (2005–10), Lucas Hood on Banshee (2013–16), and Homelander on The Boys (2019–present).

For his role in the 2012 Australian film Wish You Were Here, Starr won the AACTA Award for Best Actor in a Supporting Role, among other accolades. He was nominated for the New Zealand Film Award for Best Actor for his performance in After the Waterfall (2010).

Career
Starr began his professional acting career early in the 1990s with a small part in Shortland Street and had guest roles in Xena: Warrior Princess.

In 2001, Starr was cast in Mercy Peak as Todd Van der Velter, a guest role that he had throughout the show's three seasons. He also received a role as the brother of long running character Waverley Wilson in the soap opera Shortland Street. He appeared for several weeks as part of the write out of the Minnie Crozier character. Starr stated he did not like the fast pace of the show and thought his performances suffered because of it.

Since then, Starr's television credits have included a core cast role in kids' series Hard Out and guest roles in P.E.T. Detectives and Street Legal as well as a brief stint in Serial Killers, the comedy series that was penned by Outrageous Fortune co-creator James Griffin.

Playing twins Van and Jethro West won Starr the 2007 Air New Zealand Screen Award for Performance by an Actor, the award for Best Actor at the Qantas Television Awards and Best Actor at the Asian TV Awards in the same year. Readers of the TV Guide also voted Starr Best Actor in the 2007 TV Guide Best on the Box People's Choice Awards. In 2005, he was named Best Actor at the inaugural Qantas Television Awards for his role in Outrageous Fortune.

During the production of the first series of Outrageous Fortune, Starr also juggled filming for Toa Fraser's debut feature, No. 2 which was released in New Zealand in early 2006. Starr's other film credits include Roger Donaldson's The World's Fastest Indian, the US comedy feature Without a Paddle and Brad McGann's feature film In My Father's Den. Between series two and three of Outrageous Fortune, Starr worked on a collaborative short film with some friends.

Starr appeared on stage in the second edition of Sex with Strangers (2005). In 2004, Starr performed in two theatre productions: Closer at Auckland's Silo Theatre and Sex with Strangers directed by Colin Mitchell at the Herald Theatre.

Between filming Outrageous Fortune seasons five and six, Starr starred in feature film After the Waterfall and the telefeature Spies and Lies.

In 2011, Starr joined the cast of the Australian police drama Rush, playing Senior Sergeant Charlie Lewis. He will also have a role in the second series of Lowdown.

From 2013 to 2016, Starr starred in the television series, Banshee, his first role on U.S. television. He played an unnamed ex-con who, after 15 years in prison, assumes the identity of Lucas Hood, becoming the new Sheriff of Banshee. Trying to reconnect with his former lover, Anastasia, both learn that he "has become a distant (violent) version of the man he once was". The show's fourth and final season began in April 2016. Also in 2016, Starr portrayed main character Garrett Hawthorne on the CBS crime/mystery series American Gothic.

In January 2018, it was announced that Starr was cast as The Homelander in The Boys, Amazon Studios' adaptation of the Garth Ennis and Darick Robertson comic book of the same name. Season one was released in July 2019 and season two was released in September 2020. Season three was released in June 2022.  In the series he plays opposite Karl Urban who is also from New Zealand. "We've got an American show with a Kiwi playing an all-American hero psychopath and another Kiwi playing an Englishman. It's a pretty bizarre mix-up," said Starr.

Personal life
On 4 March 2022, it was reported that Starr was arrested in Alicante, Spain after assaulting a 21-year old chef at a local pub. He was sentenced to a 12-month suspended prison sentence and paid $5,530 in restitution to avoid prison time.

Filmography

Film

Television

Online

Awards and nominations

References

External links

 
 Antony Starr biography on NZ On Screen

New Zealand male film actors
New Zealand male television actors
New Zealand male soap opera actors
1975 births
Living people
Best Supporting Actor AACTA Award winners
20th-century New Zealand male actors
21st-century New Zealand male actors
New Zealand expatriate actors
New Zealand expatriates in the United States